The 1977 Chicago Marathon was the first running of the annual marathon race in Chicago, United States and was held on September 25. The elite men's and women's races were won by Americans Dan Cloeter (2:17:52 hours) and Dorothy Doolittle (2:50:47). A total of 2128 runners finished the race. It marked a return of a full marathon race to the city, following on from the Windy City Marathon of the 1960s.

Results

Men

Women

References

Results. Association of Road Racing Statisticians. Retrieved 2020-05-26.
Chicago Marathon Year-By-Year. Chicago Marathon. Retrieved 2020-05-26.

External links 
 Official website

1977
Chicago
1970s in Chicago
1977 in Illinois
Chicago Marathon
Chicago Marathon